Rafqa Pietra Chobok (Arabic: رفقا بطرسيّة شبق , June 29, 1832 – March 23, 1914), also known as Saint Rafka and Saint Rebecca, was a Lebanese Maronite nun who was canonized by Pope John Paul II on June 10, 2001.

Birth and youth
Rafka was born in Himlaya, in Matn District, on June 29, 1832, the Feast of Saints Peter and Paul, the only child of Saber Mourad El Rayess and Rafqa Gemayel, and was baptised Boutrossieh (the Arabic feminine of Peter). Her mother died when she was seven years old. In 1843, her father experienced financial difficulties and sent her to work as a servant for four years in Damascus at the home of Assaad Al-Badawi. She returned home in 1847 to find that her father had remarried.

When Boutrossieh was 14 years old, her stepmother wanted her to marry her brother, while her maternal aunt wanted her to marry her son. Boutrossieh did not want to marry either man, and this caused much discord in her family. One day, while she was coming back from the fountain holding her jar, she overheard them arguing. She asked God to help her deal with the problem. She then decided to become a nun and went straight to the Convent of Our Lady of Liberation at Bikfaya. Boutrossieh's father and stepmother tried to take her back home but she refused. They returned home dismayed, and from then on never saw her again.

Boutrossieh's kinsman, Joseph Gemayel, and his family founded a new religious institute for women that provided them with full-time education as well as religious instruction. Boutrossieh's name, Pierine (in French), was listed last among the first four candidates of the Daughters of Mary of the Immaculate Conception ("Mariamettes", in French) in Gemayel's notebook dated January 1, 1853. She was 21.

Mariamette Sisters
In 1860, while still stationed in Ghazir, Rafqa's superiors sent her on a temporary posting to Deir-el-Qamar, in Mount Lebanon - Shouf, where she helped the Jesuit mission. In less than two months the Druze killed 7,771 people and destroyed 360 villages, 560 churches, 28 schools, and 42 convents. Sister Rafqa saved one child's life by hiding him in the skirts of her habit as he was being chased by some soldiers. Rafqa was deeply affected by the massacres.

Following a year of postulancy, Rafqa received the habit of her congregation on the feast of St. Joseph, March 19, 1861. She took her first temporary religious vows on March 19, 1862 at the age of thirty. Sister Rafqa's first assignment in the congregation was charge of the kitchen service in the Jesuit school in Ghazir, where she spent seven years. She was placed in charge of the workers and had the task of giving them religious instruction in a spinning mill in Scerdanieh, where she remained for two months.

Two years later, Sister Rafqa was sent to teach at Byblos, where she remained for one year before going to Ma'ad to establish a school there at the request of Antoun (Anthony) Issa, a prominent citizen.

In 1871, the "Mariamettes" religious institute merged with another to form the Order of the Sacred Hearts of Jesus and Mary. The Religious Sisters were given the option to join the new congregation, or a different one, or to resume lay status. Rafqa decided to become a cloistered nun rather than a teaching Sister, and, after praying in the Church of St. George, made the decision to join the Baladita Order, the monastic order now named the Lebanese Maronite Order of St. Anthony, founded in 1695, and told Antoun Issa of her decision. He offered to pay the requisite dowry.

That same night, Rafqa dreamed of three men. One with a white beard, one dressed like a soldier and the third was an old man. She recounted "One of the men said to me, 'Become a nun in the Baladita Order'. I woke up very happy ... and went to Antoun Issa, bursting with joy ... and I told him about my dream." Antoun identified the men as Anthony of Qozhaia (Anthony the Abbot) from whom the order was inspired, the soldier was Saint George, to whom the church in Ma'ad was dedicated, and the third could only be a Baladita monk. Rafqa decided to leave immediately for the Monastery of St. Simon in Al-Qarn. Antoun gave her the money as promised as well as a letter of recommendation to the archbishop.

A nun of the Lebanese Maronite Order

Monastery of St. Simon
On July 12, 1871, at the age of thirty-nine, Rafqa began her novitiate into the new monastery and then on August 25, 1873, she "professed her perpetual vows of poverty, chastity and obedience in the spirit of the strict Rule of the Baladita Order". She took on the new name that was her mother’s: Rafqa, (Rebecca), the name of Abraham's great-granddaughter and wife of his son Isaac. 

St. Simon Monastery was situated on a high altitude, where the winters were very harsh. The nuns followed a very rigid daily schedule throughout the year. Prayer and manual labour became the rule of their daily lives. The nuns planted and harvested vegetables and grain in the surrounding fields. They also cultivated silkworms and sewed vestments for churches. Rafqa remained in this monastery until 1897.

Illness

In 1885, Rafqa decided not to join the nuns for a walk around the monastery. In her autobiographical account she wrote, It was the first Sunday of the Rosary. I did not accompany them. Before leaving each of the nuns came and said to me, 'Pray for me sister.' There were some who asked me to say seven decades of the Rosary ... I went to the Church and started to pray. Seeing that I was in good health and that I had never been sick in my life, I prayed to God in this way, 'Why, O my God, have you distance yourself from me and have abandoned me. You have never visited me with sickness! Have you perhaps abandoned me?'"

Rafqa continued in her account to her superior, the next night after the prayer "At the moment of sleeping I felt a most violent pain spreading above my eyes to the point that I reached the state you see me in, blind and paralyzed, and as I myself had asked for sickness I could not allow myself to complain or murmur."

The mother superior sent Rafqa to Tripoli, where she had a painful medical examination. She suffered two years, with several doctors concluding there was nothing they could do. Upon the persuasion of the priest Estefan, Rafqa consulted a visiting American doctor who strongly suggested that the affected eye be removed. Estefan later recounted, "Before the operation I asked the doctor to anesthetize the eye so that Rafqa would not feel any pain but she refused. The doctor made her sit down and pushed a long scalpel ... into her eye ... the eye popped out and fell on the ground, palpitating slightly.... Rafqa didn't complain ... but only said, 'in communion with Christ's Passion'." The pain was then all concentrated in her left eye and nothing could be done.

Gradually, Rafqa became blind. She continued to experience intense pain in her head, but considered this an opportunity to share in Jesus' Passion. Rafqa did not let this pain isolate her from the community. She continued to spin wool and cotton, and knitted stockings for the other sisters; she also participated in choral prayer.

Due to the harsh winters at the Monastery of St. Simon, Rafqa was permitted to spend the coldest months on the Lebanese coast as a guest of the Daughters of Charity and then of the residence of the Maronite Order. Unable to observe the Rule at these locales, Rafqa asked to be taken to the Monastery of St. Elias at El Rass, which belonged to her order.

Monastery of St. Joseph

Based on direct evidence and on the autopsy of Rafqa's remains in 1927, 

Rafqa's obedience and love for her superior is quite evident in this account. 

 Then on March 23, 1914, four minutes after receiving the Last Rites and the plenary indulgence, she died.

Beatification and canonization

On June 9, 1984, the vigil of Pentecost, in the presence of the Pope John Paul II, the decree approving the miracle of Elizabeth Ennakl, who was said to have been completely cured of uterine cancer in 1938 at the tomb of Rafqa, was promulgated.

On November 16, 1985, Pope John Paul II declared Rafqa Al Rayess a Blessed, and on June 10, 2001, he proclaimed her to be a saint at a solemn ceremony in the Vatican.

References

External links 
Life of St. Rafqa on YouTube (English subtitle series movie)
Another vita
Rafca.org Saint Rafca Website
Saints.SQPN
Catholic Online

1832 births
1914 deaths
People from Matn District
19th-century Eastern Catholic nuns
Burials in Lebanon
Lebanese Maronite saints
20th-century Christian saints
Christian female saints of the Late Modern era
Beatifications by Pope John Paul II
Canonizations by Pope John Paul II
Venerated Catholics by Pope John Paul II
20th-century Eastern Catholic nuns